"Kiss You Back" is the lead single released from Digital Underground's second studio album (their third official release), Sons of the P. The song sampled Funkadelic's 1979 hit, "(Not Just) Knee Deep" for which the song's writers, George Clinton and Philippé Wynne, received writing credits.

Released a year after the groups breakthrough single, "The Humpty Dance", "Kiss You Back" became Digital Underground's second top-40 single, peaking at No. 40 on the Billboard Hot 100,  and earned a gold certification on April 9, 1992 for sales of 500,000 copies.

Track listing
"Kiss You Back" (Smack On The Cheek Mix)- 4:25
"Kiss You Back" (LP Mix)- 6:12
"Kiss You Back" (Full French Kiss Mix)- 6:59
"Kiss You Back" (Smackapella Mix)- 5:14

Charts

Certifications

References

Songs about kissing
1991 singles
Digital Underground songs
Songs written by George Clinton (funk musician)
1991 songs
Tommy Boy Records singles